Chit Thu Yway Mal Chit Wae Lal is a 1975 Burmese black-and-white drama film, directed by Win Oo starring Win Oo, Sandar, Myint Myint Khin, Cho Pyone, Tin Tin Nwet, Myint Myint Khine, Nwet Nwet Mu and San San Aye.

Cast
Win Oo as Win Oo, Win Htoo, Win Myuu, Win Naing, Win Khaing, Win Latt, Win Myat and their father (octuple role)
Sandar as Sandar
Myint Myint Khin as Myint Myint Khin
Cho Pyone as Cho Pyone
Tin Tin Nwet as Tin Tin Nwet
Myint Myint Khine as Myint Myint Khine
Nwet Nwet Mu as Nwet Nwet Mu
San San Aye as San San Aye

References

1975 films
1970s Burmese-language films
Burmese drama films
Films shot in Myanmar
1975 drama films